Magne Orre (born 16 April 1950) is a Norwegian cyclist. He was born in Notodden. He competed at the 1972 Summer Olympics in Munich, where he placed fifth in the team time trial with the Norwegian team, which consisted of Knut Knudsen, Thorleif Andresen, Arve Haugen and Orre. He also competed in the team time trial at the 1976 Summer Olympics in Montreal, where the Norwegian team placed eighth. He won the Norwegian National Road Race Championship in 1976.

References

1950 births
Living people
People from Notodden
Norwegian male cyclists
Olympic cyclists of Norway
Cyclists at the 1972 Summer Olympics
Cyclists at the 1976 Summer Olympics
Sportspeople from Vestfold og Telemark
20th-century Norwegian people